Long-Hawerter Mill is a historic grist mill located on Little Lehigh Creek in Longswamp Township, Berks County, Pennsylvania.  The mill was built about 1800, and is a -story banked stone building measuring 36 feet, 5 inches, wide by 26 feet, 1 inch, deep, with a slate roof.  Attached to it is a one-story, frame cider mill and one-story, frame maple sugar house.  Also on the property are the watercourses, consisting of the headrace, pond, and dam.  The mill operated into the 1950s.

It was listed on the National Register of Historic Places in 1990.

References

Grinding mills in Berks County, Pennsylvania
Grinding mills on the National Register of Historic Places in Pennsylvania
Industrial buildings completed in 1800
National Register of Historic Places in Berks County, Pennsylvania